Alex Basso is a retired Argentine-American soccer player.  He played professionally in the American Soccer League, Superleague Greece, Western Soccer Alliance and Major Indoor Soccer League.

Born in Argentina, Basso grew up in Fremont, California where he played for the Fremont United and Newark Soccer Clubs. In 1978, he graduated from John F. Kennedy High School where he played on the boys' soccer team. In 1979, he signed with the Detroit Lightning of the Major Indoor Soccer League. In 1980, he moved outdoors with the Golden Gate Gales of the American Soccer League. In 1981, he played for New York United.
In December 1981 he signed a five-year contract with Greek first division club Panionios, but he stayed only half season, till June 1982.

From 1984 to 1987, Basso played for the United States national futsal team.  In 1988, he joined the San Jose Earthquakes of the Western Soccer Alliance.  In 1989, he played for the San Francisco Bay Blackhawks.  In 1990, he was the captain of Real Santa Barbara of the American Professional Soccer League.

References

External links
 MISL/ASL stats

Living people
American men's futsal players
American soccer players
American Professional Soccer League players
American Soccer League (1933–1983) players
Detroit Lightning players
Golden Gate Gales players
San Francisco Bay Blackhawks players
San Jose Earthquakes (1974–1988) players
New York United players
Major Indoor Soccer League (1978–1992) players
Real Santa Barbara players
Western Soccer Alliance players
Association football forwards
1960 births